Estonianisation is the changing of one's personal names from other languages into Estonian. Less often, the term has also been applied in the context of the development of Estonian language, culture and identity within educational and other state institutions through various programmes.

Family names
Before 1918, when Estonia became an independent country, around half of the country's ethnic Estonian population carried foreign language (mostly German) or "foreign-sounding", i.e. non-Estonian surnames. In the 1920s, and especially in the 1930s, the government promoted a nationwide voluntary "surname Estonianization campaign". During the campaign about 200.000 of Estonian citizens chose a new surname to replace their original family name. A smaller part of the people also Estonianized their first name(s) at the same time. The Estonianization of names stopped almost completely after the Soviet Union invaded and occupied Estonia in 1940.

Notable Estonianized names
Paul Berg → Paul Ariste
Karl August Einbund → Kaarel Eenpalu
Erhard-Voldemar Esperk → Ants Eskola
Hans Laipman → Ants Laikmaa
Friedebert Mihkelson → Friedebert Tuglas
Kristjan Trossmann → Kristjan Palusalu

Integration
After the end of the 1944–1991 Soviet occupation of Estonia, following the restoration of the country's full independence in 1991, the Estonian government has pursued an "integration policy" (informally referred to as "Estonianisation") that has been aimed at the strengthening of Estonian identity among the population, to develop shared values and "pride in being a citizen of Estonia"; with respect and acceptance of cultural differences among the residents of Estonia.

Education
On 14 March 2000 the Government of Estonia adopted “State Programme “Integration in Estonian society 2000-2007". Main areas and aims of the integration established by the program are linguistic-communicative, legal-political and socio-economical. The Program has four sub programs: education, the education and culture of national minorities, the teaching of Estonian to adults and social competence. The aim of the sub-programs is to be achieved via the learning of the Estonian language by children and adults.

External links 
 Database of Estonianised Surnames 1919–1940 (at National Archives)

References

Social history of Estonia
 Estonian language
Cultural assimilation